Of Reminiscences and Reflections is an orchestral composition by the American composer Gunther Schuller.  It was composed on a commission from the Louisville Orchestra as an elegy to Schuller's wife Marjorie, who died in November 1992.  The composition was written over a 17-day period in September 1993 and has a duration of roughly 20 minutes.  The piece was awarded the 1994 Pulitzer Prize for Music.

References

Compositions by Gunther Schuller
1993 compositions
Compositions for symphony orchestra
Pulitzer Prize for Music-winning works
Music commissioned by the Louisville Orchestra